Lieutenant-Colonel Sir Armine Brereton Dew  (1867–1941) was a British Indian Army officer and administrator in British India; he served as the Chief Commissioner of Balochistan during colonial rule.

He was the son of Major Frederick Napoleon Dew, J.P., D.L. Herefordshire.

He was educated at Wellington College then in February 1886 was commissioned into the 4th Battalion of the Shropshire Light Infantry, a unit of the Militia.

Then Dew obtained a commission into the regular army, being commissioned into the Royal Inniskilling Fusiliers in November 1888. He was appointed to the Indian Army and the Queen's Own Corps of Guides in December 1889. He was promoted to Lieutenant in 1891 and took part in the Hazara 1891 operations (earning medal & clasp). Attached the Gilgit Agency, 1894, appointed to civil employment with the Political Department with the North West Frontier Province in December 1897  and promoted Captain in 1899.

He married in 1900 to Esme Mary, daughter of Sir Adelbert Talbot, KCIE.

Promoted to Major in 1906. He was Political Agent in Gilgit from 1908 to 1912 in 1911 was appointed a CIE. He was promoted to Lieutenant-Colonel in 1914.  He was Political Agent for the princely state of Kalat from 1912 to 1917 and was appointed a CSI in 1915. He was mentioned in despatches in the London Gazette 31 October 1917.

He was appointed Revenue and Judicial Commissioner, Baluchistan, 1917; Agent to the Governor-General and Chief Commissioner, Baluchistan, 1919–22.

He was knighted with the KCIE in 1921.

He retired on 1 December 1922.

Styles
1867-1886: Armine Brereton Dew
1886-1891: Second Lieutenant Armine Brereton Dew
1891-1899: Lieutenant Armine Brereton Dew
1899-1906: Captain Armine Brereton Dew
1906-1911: Major Armine Brereton Dew
1911-1914: Major Armine Brereton Dew, CIE
1914-1915: Lieutenant-Colonel Armine Brereton Dew, CIE
1915-1921: Lieutenant-Colonel Armine Brereton Dew, CSI, CIE
1921-1941: Lieutenant-Colonel Sir Armine Brereton Dew, KCIE, CSI

References

1867 births
1941 deaths
British Indian Army officers
Administrators in British India
Knights Commander of the Order of the Indian Empire
Companions of the Order of the Star of India
King's Shropshire Light Infantry officers
Royal Inniskilling Fusiliers officers
People educated at Wellington College, Berkshire